Kalundborg railway station ( or Kalundborg Banegård) is the main railway station serving the town of Kalundborg in northwestern Zealand, Denmark. It is located in the centre of the town, close to the Port of Kalundborg, and immediately adjacent to the Kalundborg bus station and Kalundborg ferry terminal.

Kalundborg station is located on the main line Northwest Line from Roskilde to Kalundborg. The station opened in 1874, and its second and current station building designed by the architect Ole Ejnar Bonding was inaugurated in 1960. It offers direct regional rail services to Holbæk, Roskilde and Copenhagen operated by the national railway company DSB.

See also
 List of railway stations in Denmark

References

Citations

Bibliography

External links

 Banedanmark – government agency responsible for maintenance and traffic control of most of the Danish railway network
 DSB – the Danish national train operating company
 Lokaltog – Danish regional railway company operating in the Capital Region and Region Zealand
 Danske Jernbaner – website with information on railway history in Denmark

railway station
Railway stations in Region Zealand
Buildings and structures in Kalundborg Municipality
Railway stations opened in 1874
1874 establishments in Denmark
Adolf Ahrens railway stations
Ole Ejnar Bonding railway stations
Railway stations in Denmark opened in the 19th century